The 2016–17 Binghamton Bearcats men's basketball team represented Binghamton University during the 2016–17 NCAA Division I men's basketball season. The Bearcats, led by fifth-year head coach Tommy Dempsey, played their home games at the Binghamton University Events Center as members of the America East Conference. They finished the season 12–20, 3–13 in America East play to finish in a tie for eighth place. They lost in the quarterfinals of the America East tournament to Stony Brook.

Previous season
The Bearcats finished the season 8–22, 5–11 in America East play to finish in sixth place. They lost in the quarterfinals of the America East tournament to New Hampshire.

Preseason 
Binghamton was picked to finish fourth in the preseason America East poll. Willie Rodriguez, Jr. was selected to the preseason All-America East team.

Departures

2016 incoming recruits

Roster

Schedule and results

|-
!colspan=9 style=| Non-conference regular season

|-
!colspan=9 style=| America East regular season

|-
!colspan=9 style=| America East tournament

References

Binghamton Bearcats men's basketball seasons
Binghamton
Binghamton Bearcats men's basketball
Binghamton Bearcats men's basketball